Gregory Alan Christy (born April 29, 1962) is a former American football offensive tackle. He went to the Buffalo Bills in 1985 after being selected by the Baltimore Stars of the USFL in the Territorial Draft. His Bills jersey number was #69. He played in 7 NFL games in 1985 with the Bills before suffering a career-ending injury. In his playing days, Christy was 6'4" and 285 pounds. He played for the University of Pittsburgh from 1980 - 1984. His jersey number was #73 for the Panthers where he played in 4 consecutive Bowl games as a tackle. Christy protected Dan Marino during his time at Pitt as well. Christy played high school football for the Freeport Senior High School.

External links
http://www.pro-football-reference.com/players/C/ChriGr20.htm
https://web.archive.org/web/20100419064739/http://www.fanbase.com/Pittsburgh-Panthers-Football
http://www.profootballhof.com/assets/history/Brothers_Mar_13_2006.pdf 
http://www.usfl.info/1985territorial.html

1962 births
Living people
People from Harrison Township, Allegheny County, Pennsylvania
Players of American football from Pennsylvania
American football offensive tackles
Pittsburgh Panthers football players
Buffalo Bills players